Gerhardus "Hardus" Pienaar (born 10 August 1981 in Rustenburg, North West) is a South African javelin thrower and former Junior World Champion from South Africa. His personal best throw is 84.50 metres, achieved in October 2003 in Hyderabad. He is widely considered to be one of the greatest javelin throwers in South African history.

Early life 
Although Pienaar was born in Rustenburg South Africa, he grew up in Middelburg Mpumalanga where he attended Kanonkop Primary and Kanonkop High School.  Pienaar excelled as an athlete from an early age and was notably stronger and faster than his teammates.  During Primary School, his strongest athletic events were the 100 meter sprint and shot put.  He represented his province at a national level and there are still many of his records to this date at the town's local track and field events.

Pienaar took on the javelin throw at age 15 and only seriously at age 16.  He quickly became the number one athlete in his school and eventually the South African province of Mpumalanga. He won every major high school track and field event and in 1998 became the Junior South African Champion at age 16, only one year after he picked up a javelin for the first time.  Later that year, Pienaar was selected to represent South Africa at the IAAF World Junior Championship in Annecy, France.  He won the silver medal with a distance of 71.16 meters. In October of the same year, he became the Junior World Champion at the ISF junior World Championships held in Shanghai with a winning distance of 79.46. Shortly after his return from Shanghai, Pienaar threw an unofficial distance of 81.94 at a local high school track and field event.  The distance was further than the official junior world record, but due to the event staff and measuring equipment not having been officially calibrated, Pienaar's junior world record could not be regarded as official by the IAAF.

Pienaar graduated from Kanonkop High School in Middelburg, South Africa and was invited to attend the prestigious training group at Potchefstroom University under the watchful eye of coach Tersis Liebenburg in 2000. During his tenure at Potchefstroom, he won the gold medal at the IAAF Coca-Cola World Junior Championships held in Santiago, Chile with a distance of 78.11.

He completed his first year and remained a student until 2001 when he decided to pursue athletics full-time.

Career 
2001
Pienaar had a best performance of 80.77 in Potchefstroom and also was a World Student Games Finalist.

2002
Pienaar became the South African champion and won the gold medal at the African Championships in Rades, Tunisia with a distance of 78.63.    He also came in 5th place at the IAAF World Cup in Athletics held in Madrid, Spain.  His season best was 81.40 in Boechout, Belgium.

2003
Pienaar again won the South African Championship and threw a personal best of 84.50 in Hyderabad, India.  This qualified Pienaar for the Olympic games in Athens, Greece.

2004
Pienaar held on to his National Champion title and Pienaar again won the gold medal at the African Championships in Brazzaville, in the Republic of the Congo, with a distance of 78.31. Pienaar made the final round of the 28th Olympic games in Athens and ended in 7th place with a distance of 79.95.    His personal best for the season was 82.34.  which he threw at Warsaw, Poland.

2005
Pienaar lost his South African title to Lohan Rautenbach and had a season best of 77.07.

2006
Pienaar regained the South African title again won the gold medal at the African Championships in Bambous, Mauritius with a distance of 77.55.  Pienaar qualified for the Commonwealth Games in Melbourne, Australia and finished in 4th place.  Pienaar also attended the IAAF World Cup in Athens and won the silver medal with a distance of 83.62.

2007
Pienaar won the silver medal at the South African National Championship with a season best  of 82.96.   in Oudshoorn, South Africa.  He also came in 7th place at the IAAF World Championships in Osaka, Japan with a distance of 79.30.

2008
Pienaar again won the silver medal at the South African National Championship with a distance of 80.49.    His personal best for the season was 80.49 which he threw at Goteborg, Sweden and just fell short of the Olympic qualifying distance of 81.80.

2009
Pienaar through a season best of 78.14 in Doha, Qatar.

2010
Pienaar again won the South African Championship and won silver at the IAAF Continental Cup with a season best of 83.19 in Split, Croatia.

2010
Pienaar opened the season with a distance of 77.65 in Bellville South Africa.

International competitions

Seasonal bests by year
1998 - 71.16
1999 - 75.71
2000 - 78.11
2001 - 80.77
2002 - 81.40
2003 - 84.50
2004 - 82.34
2005 - 77.07
2006 - 84.28
2007 - 82.96
2008 - 80.49
2009 - 78.14
2010 - 83.17
2011 - 77.65
2012 - 72.04

References

External links

1981 births
Living people
People from Rustenburg
People from Middelburg, Mpumalanga
South African male javelin throwers
Olympic athletes of South Africa
Athletes (track and field) at the 2004 Summer Olympics
Commonwealth Games competitors for South Africa
Athletes (track and field) at the 2006 Commonwealth Games
African Games gold medalists for South Africa
African Games medalists in athletics (track and field)
Athletes (track and field) at the 2003 All-Africa Games
Athletes (track and field) at the 2007 All-Africa Games
Athletes (track and field) at the 2011 All-Africa Games
World Athletics Championships athletes for South Africa
Afrikaner people
University of Pretoria alumni